Saline County is a county in Southern Illinois. At the 2020 census, it had a population of 23,768. The largest city and county seat is Harrisburg. This area of Southern Illinois is known locally as "Little Egypt".

Three major towns in Saline County are connected by U.S. Route 45, and formerly by the now-abandoned Cairo and Vincennes/Big Four/New York Central Line, from north to south: Eldorado, Harrisburg, and Carrier Mills.

Geography 

The Saline County area is mostly rolling hills throughout gradually rising to the Hills of the Shawnee National Forest. The Saline River flows through the central point of the county in three forks: North, Middle, and South. To the north of Eldorado there are flat lowlands.

Climate and weather

Adjacent counties

 Hamilton County (north)
 White County (northeast)
 Gallatin County (east)
 Hardin County (southeast)
 Pope County (south)
 Johnson County (southwest)
 Williamson County (west)
 Franklin County (northwest)

National protected area
 Shawnee National Forest (part)

State protected areas
 Sahara Woods State Fish and Wildlife Area
 Saline County State Fish and Wildlife Area

Transportation

Major highways
  U.S. Highway 45
  Illinois Route 13
  Illinois Route 34
  Illinois Route 142
  Illinois Route 145

Demographics

As of the 2010 United States Census, there were 24,913 people, 10,379 households, and 6,631 families residing in the county. The racial makeup of the county was 93.0% white, 4.0% black or African American, 0.4% Asian, 0.4% American Indian, 0.1% Pacific islander, 0.4% from other races, and 1.8% from two or more races. Those of Hispanic or Latino origin made up 1.4% of the population. In terms of ancestry, 17.8% were Irish, 16.6% were German, 12.9% were American, and 11.1% were English.

Of the 10,379 households, 29.0% had children under the age of 18 living with them, 47.4% were married couples living together, 11.7% had a female householder with no husband present, 36.1% were non-families, and 31.9% of all households were made up of individuals. The average household size was 2.32 and the average family size was 2.89. The median age was 41.7 years.

The median income for a household in the county was $35,644 and the median income for a family was $46,314. Males had a median income of $41,108 versus $28,464 for females. The per capita income for the county was $20,903. About 13.4% of families and 18.4% of the population were below the poverty line, including 26.5% of those under age 18 and 10.4% of those age 65 or over.

Communities

Cities
 Eldorado
 Harrisburg

Villages
 Carrier Mills (Morrilsville)
 Galatia
 Muddy
 Raleigh
 Stonefort (partly in Williamson County)

Unincorporated communities

 Buena Vista
 Cottage Grove
 Delta
 Derby
 Eagle
 Harco
 Lakeview (Pond Settlement)
 Ledford
 Liberty
 Mitchellsville
 New Hope
 Pankeyville
 Rudement
 Somerset
 Texas City
 Wasson
 West End

Townships
Saline County is divided into thirteen townships:

 Brushy
 Carrier Mills
 Cottage
 East Eldorado
 Galatia
 Harrisburg
 Independence
 Long Branch
 Mountain
 Raleigh
 Rector
 Stone Fort
 Tate

Politics

See also
 National Register of Historic Places listings in Saline County
 Ku Klux Klan in Southern Illinois

References

External links
 Saline County Chamber of Commerce
 Saline County Official Website (Under Development)
 "Tails and Trails of Illinois", Stu Fliege, University of Illinois Press,2002.
 "https://web.archive.org/web/20120206132243/http://www.iltrails.org/saline/towns_cities.html, © 2000-2001 by Debbie Woolard, Illinois Trails History and Genealogy.
 Gillum Ferguson. 2007. The Perilous Infancy of Saline County, Journal of Illinois History, Vol. 10, p. 49.

 
Illinois counties
1847 establishments in Illinois
Saline County, Illinois
Saline County, Illinois
Populated places established in 1847